The Socialists, Democrats and Greens Group (SOC) is a primarily social-democratic political grouping in the Parliamentary Assembly of the Council of Europe. It was known as the Socialist Group prior to August 2017.

The group has 163 members as of March 2018. Its chair is Liliane Maury Pasquier of the Social Democratic Party of Switzerland.

Socialist Group membership as of 2011

See also

 Progressive Alliance of Socialists and Democrats

References

External links
Official website
Page on the PACE website

 
Socialist organizations in Europe
Political groups in the Parliamentary Assembly of the Council of Europe